Earl of Westmeath is a title in the Peerage of Ireland. It was created in 1621 for Richard Nugent, Baron Delvin. During the Tudor era the loyalty of the Nugent family was often in question, and Richard's father, the sixth Baron, died in prison while awaiting trial for treason, a crime for which other members of the family had already been condemned. Richard himself when young was suspected of plotting rebellion and was imprisoned, but in later life, he was a staunch supporter of the Crown, which rewarded him richly for his loyalty. The fifth Earl was a Major-General in the British Army. The sixth Earl was sworn of the Irish Privy Council in 1758. His son by his first wife, Richard Nugent, Lord Delvin, was killed in a duel at an early age. Lord Westmeath was succeeded by his second son by his second wife, the seventh Earl. He sat in the House of Lords as one of the original 28 Irish Representative Peers; he was also involved in a much-publicised divorce following an action for criminal conversation against his wife and her lover. He was succeeded by his son, the eighth Earl. He was created Marquess of Westmeath in the Peerage of Ireland in 1822. He had no surviving male issue and the marquessate became extinct on his death in 1871. He was succeeded in the barony and earldom by his kinsman, Anthony Francis Nugent, the ninth Earl, who was a claimant to the title Baron Nugent of Riverston. The eleventh Earl was an Irish Representative Peer from 1901 to 1933.

Barons Delvin (c. 1389/1486)
William Fitzrichard Nugent, 1st Baron Delvin (died )
Richard Nugent, 2nd Baron Delvin (died 1475)
Christopher Nugent, 3rd Baron Delvin (died )
Richard Nugent, 4th Baron Delvin (died 1537)
Richard Nugent, 5th Baron Delvin (1523–1559)
Christopher Nugent, 6th Baron Delvin (1544–1602)
Richard Nugent, 7th Baron Delvin (1583–1642) (created Earl of Westmeath in 1621)

Earls of Westmeath (1621)
 Richard Nugent, 1st Earl of Westmeath (1583–1642)
 Richard Nugent, 2nd Earl of Westmeath (1621–1684)
 Richard Nugent, 3rd Earl of Westmeath (died 1714)
 Thomas Nugent, 4th Earl of Westmeath (1669–1752)
 John Nugent, 5th Earl of Westmeath (1671–1754)
 Thomas Nugent, 6th Earl of Westmeath (1714–1792)
 George Frederick Nugent, 7th Earl of Westmeath (1760–1814) 
 George Thomas John Nugent, 8th Earl of Westmeath (1785–1871) (created Marquess of Westmeath in 1822)

Marquesses of Westmeath (1822)
George Thomas John Nugent, 1st Marquess of Westmeath (1785–1871)

Earls of Westmeath (1621; Reverted)
Anthony Francis Nugent, 9th Earl of Westmeath (1805–1879)
William St George Nugent, 10th Earl of Westmeath (1832–1883)
Anthony Francis Nugent, 11th Earl of Westmeath (1870–1933) 
Gilbert Charles Nugent, 12th Earl of Westmeath (1880–1971)
William Anthony Nugent, 13th Earl of Westmeath (born 1928)

The heir apparent is the present holder's son Sean Charles Weston Nugent, Lord Delvin (born 1965).
The heir apparent's heir presumptive is his brother Hon. Patrick Mark Leonard Nugent (born 1966).

References

Earldoms in the Peerage of Ireland
Noble titles created in 1621